The lordship salvation controversy (also called lordship controversy) is a theological dispute regarding a soteriological question within Christianity on the relationship between faith and works. This debate has been notably present among some non-denominational and Evangelical churches in North America at least since the 1980s.

The dispute opposes two soteriological visions: "whether it is necessary to accept Christ as Lord in order to have Him as one's Savior. The question then becomes, If someone accepts Christ as Savior without also explicitly accepting Him as Lord, is such a person truly saved?". That is, whether accepting Jesus Christ as saviour necessarily implies one must make a concrete commitment in life toward the Christ such as following a certain behaviour or moral system. The first opinion, that of the lordship salvation supporters, is, as Arthur W. Pink summarises: "No one can receive Christ as His Savior while he rejects Him as Lord. Therefore, those who have not bowed to Christ’s scepter and enthroned Him in their hearts and lives, and yet imagine that they are trusting Him as Savior, are deceived". The second opinion is that of those opposing lordship salvation: that one can accept Jesus Christ as saviour, but does not need to accept the Christ's lordship.

Background
"By grace alone" and "through faith alone" are two of the five solae of the Protestant Reformation.  Many Protestants affirm these phrases as distinctively Protestant, whereas the Lordship Salvation controversy concerns what grace and faith must include, and what they must exclude, for a person to "have salvation" in the evangelical Protestant sense.  The language of what must be included permeates the whole debate and is often transferred from the meaning of the concepts to the status of someone's experience; thus, "As a part of his saving work, God will produce repentance, faith, sanctification, yieldedness, obedience, and ultimately glorification.  Since he is not dependent on human effort in producing these elements, an experience that lacks any of them cannot be the saving work of God."Given the accepting-as phraseology of the popular GNB of Colossians 2:6, and the receiving-as phraseology in the widely popular NIV of Colossians 2:6, an exegesis based on the NIV, for example, offered an explanation of what manner of receiving this was. John F. MacArthur Jr, in turn, taught that such a receiving was both non-passive toward Christ and actively submissive to Christ, offering this as a way of understanding the English idiom, of what receiving a person "as" Lord, really means.

Yet the "as Lord" language was not the only metaphor for the controversy.  In 1959, Eternity featured a twin set of articles which ignited the debate and the use of the idiom from the titles: what Christ must "be." This asked what Christ must "be" to the one accepting Christ: must he "be Lord" to "be Savior," both, etc.  Ten years later (1969), Charles Ryrie used this idiom in a chapter title, verbatim, quoting exactly the title of the articles in Eternity Magazine, September, 1959.  This idiom, what Christ must "be", was used to derive and discuss the implications for salvation associated with what Christ is.  One author, Arthur W. Pink (1886–1952), had already associated Christ's Lordship with surrendering to it as a sine qua non at the initial point.

In 1988, John F. MacArthur Jr published the first edition of The Gospel According to Jesus. By defining salvation by what it produces and what salvation will not fail to produce, (not only glorification, but good works, repentance, faith, sanctification, yieldedness, and obedience) the book not only heavily spread the extent of the debate, but the debate expanded in scope, from questions about conversion issues, to questions about what is also necessary, and who it is who does what, throughout the Christian life.  Using surrender language in the gospel became another issue.

Free Grace theology became an umbrella term for a variety of opposing or contrasting positions, sometimes arguing that Lordship salvation was legalistic, sometimes more opposed to it than that, for example, faulting it for not being specific about what degree, quality, and current visibility there must be to the necessary obedience.

History of the debate

Precursors 
A similar controversy was caused by the Neonomianism of Richard Baxter, to which Lordship salvation has been compared to.

The Antinomian controversy is the most similar controversy in history to the modern Lordship salvation controversy.

Background

Figures of the Reformed tradition and their historical dispute with Arminian Protestants over a person's participatory role in salvation, a debate which many Calvinists identify with the original sin issue Augustine wrote of in his polemics against the British monk Pelagius, gave Reformed scholars and church leaders an intellectual tradition from which to oppose what they considered a false gospel.
 
An early discussion about the initial conversion aspect of the Lordship salvation issue was in the 1948 systematic theology of Lewis Sperry Chafer, using (and criticizing) the phrase "believe and surrender to God".  A.W. Pink, also used this language, but anticipated (and advocated) key terms in the later debate, speaking of both 'surrender' and 'Lordship'.  Connection of the word "Lordship" and salvation existed in a Ph.D. dissertation at Wheaton College in 1958. Therefore, the use of the term 'Lordship salvation' came before the first edition of MacArthur's 1988 book, possibly after the 1959 debate in Eternity magazine, Sep 1959, between Presbyterian Everett F. Harrison, a professor at Fuller Theological Seminary, and John Stott, an Anglican theologian.

Modern dispute
The controversy moved to the forefront of the evangelical world in the late 1980s when John F. MacArthur argued that the one-third of all Americans who claimed to be born again according to a 1980 Gallup poll reflected millions who are deceived, possessing a false, soul-destroying assurance.

There was much-published response, particularly from seminary faculty. For example, an early review of the 1988 edition of The Gospel According to Jesus appeared in a Jan–Mar 1989 Bibliotheca Sacra article by Darrell L Bock. Also in 1989, Charles Ryrie published So Great Salvation and Zane C. Hodges published Absolutely Free! A Biblical Reply to Lordship Salvation. The two 1989 book publications confined the direct debate largely to their authors' footnotes, but the Bock article, in addition to specifically giving points of disagreement and agreement with MacArthur's book, added definitional discussion of terms such as "disciple" and "Lordship," and introduced the consideration of rhetorical devices such as overstatement, into the discussion.

Yet very soon on their heels, in 1992 before the revised edition of MacArthur's work, an anthology of responses from various faculty of reformed seminaries appeared on the subject and include criticisms of both MacArthur and Hodges, especially in Michael Horton's contribution, "Don't Judge a Book by its Cover."

See also
 Perseverance of the saints
 Christian perfection
 Justification (theology)
 Holiness movement
 Sanctification
 What Would Jesus Do
 Merit (Christianity)
 Good works
 Jesus is Lord
 Marrow controversy

References

Bibliography 
 
 .
 .
 .

External links
  (advocating Lordship salvation).
 ..
 .

Christian ethics
Salvation in Protestantism
Anabaptism
Baptist Christianity
Arminianism
Calvinist theology
Christian terminology